Ivan Satrapa (born 13 July 1946, in Prague) is a Czechoslovak handball player who competed in the 1972 Summer Olympics and in the 1976 Summer Olympics.

He was part of the Czechoslovak team which won the silver medal at the Munich Games. He played all six matches and scored eleven goals.

Four years later he was a member of the Czechoslovak team which finished seventh. He played all five matches and scored nine goals.

External links
 Profile at Sports-Reference.com

1946 births
Living people
Czech male handball players
Czechoslovak male handball players
Olympic handball players of Czechoslovakia
Handball players at the 1972 Summer Olympics
Handball players at the 1976 Summer Olympics
Olympic silver medalists for Czechoslovakia
Olympic medalists in handball
Medalists at the 1972 Summer Olympics
Sportspeople from Prague